Deadsoul Tribe is the debut full-length studio album by the progressive metal band Deadsoul Tribe, released on 20 March 2002. The brief intro to "Powertrip" (before any instruments can be heard) is from the film, Fear and Loathing in Las Vegas.

Track listing 
 "Powertrip" − 3:28
 "Coming Down"	− 5:22
 "Anybody There?" − 1:18
 "The Haunted" − 4:52
 "The Drowning Machine" − 3:09
 "You" − 3:59
 "Under the Weight of My Stone" − 1:42
 "Once" − 4:50
 "One Bullet" − 5:01
 "Empty" − 1:02
 "Cry for Tomorrow" − 4:10
 "Into..." (Bonus Track) − 1:26
 "...Into the Spiral Cathedral" (Bonus Track) − 4:44

Credits 
 Devon Graves − lead vocals, guitar, flute
 Roland Ivenz − bass
 Adel Moustafa − drums
 Volker Wilschko − rhythm guitar

Deadsoul Tribe albums
2002 debut albums
Inside Out Music albums
Albums with cover art by Travis Smith (artist)